Pamela Anderson (born October 23, 1950) is an American politician and former banker serving as a member of the North Dakota House of Representatives from the 41st district.

Early life and education 
Pamela Anderson was born in Fargo, North Dakota. Growing up in Minnewaukan, North Dakota, she became class president in her junior and senior years and graduated valedictorian of her class. She studied at the University of North Dakota and obtained both her bachelor’s and master’s in economics.

Career

Banking 
In 1973, she moved back to Fargo where she pursued a career in banking. From 1973 to 1990, she was the vice president of U.S. Bank. She left U.S. bank in 1990 and started a career at Wells Fargo the same year. She worked at Wells Fargo from 1990 to 2005 where she was the senior vice president regional trust manager. In 2005, she retired from Wells Fargo and in 2014 she was elected to the North Dakota House of Representatives.

Politics 
Anderson first ran for North Dakota’s 41st district for the Democrat ticket in 2014 and defeated incumbent Republican Bette Grande. Anderson won re-election in 2018. Anderson introduced a bill to increase the legal age of using tobacco products to 19 years of age unless the individual is active military and penned a letter explaining her ideas on how to help small businesses that are being affected to Covid-19.

Personal life 
She married Wayne T. Anderson, a practicing lawyer in Fargo for 35 years, and had three children. Wayne died on July 12, 2013. She has four grandchildren.

References

External links
Official biography

21st-century American politicians
Living people
21st-century American women politicians
Women state legislators in North Dakota
People from Fargo, North Dakota
People from Benson County, North Dakota
University of North Dakota alumni
1950 births
Democratic Party members of the North Dakota House of Representatives